

Events
January – Gabriel Fauré becomes organist at the Church of Saint-Sauveur, at Rennes in Brittany.
March–December – Pyotr Ilyich Tchaikovsky writes his Symphony No. 1, Winter Daydreams.
May 30 – Bedřich Smetana's opera The Bartered Bride (Prodana Nevesta) debuts at the Provisional Theatre (Prague).
August – Sir William Sterndale Bennett becomes Principal of the Royal Academy of Music in London.
August 4 – First performance of Gabriel Fauré's Cantique de Jean Racine.
August 9 – Marie Trautmann marries fellow musician Alfred Jaëll.
October 21 – Jacques Offenbach's operetta La Vie parisienne debuts in Paris at the Théâtre du Palais Royale.
November 17 – Ambroise Thomas's opera Mignon debuts in Paris at the Opéra-Comique.
Theodore Thomas conducts the New York Philharmonic in the American premiere of the Prelude to Act 1 of Wagner's Tristan und Isolde.
Mily Balakirev publishes his Collection of Russian Folksongs, including "The Song of the Volga Boatmen".
Georges Bizet completes the opera La jolie fille de Perth; it is premiered the following year.

Published popular music
 "Come Back To Erin"  w.m. Claribel
 "We Parted By The River" w.m. William Shakespeare Hays
"When You and I Were Young, Maggie" by James A. Butterfield & George Washington Johnson
 "Write Me A Letter Home"     w.m. Will S. Hays

Classical music
Felix Draeseke – Fantasie on Themes from Boieldieus "Weisse Dame"
Johann Gottfried Piefke – Königgrätzer Marsch
Amilcare Ponchielli – Concerto for Trumpet in F major
Arthur Sullivan – Irish Symphony
Franz Von Suppre - Light Cavalry Overture

Opera
Karel Miry
 (opera in 4 acts, libretto by N. Destanberg, premiered on August 28 in Ghent)
 (opera in 1 act, libretto by N. Destanberg, premiered on October 29 in Ghent)
 (opera in 1 act, libretto by N. Destanberg, premiered on December 24 in Ghent)
Bedřich Smetana- The Bartered Bride
Franz von Suppé – Leichte Kavallerie

Musical theater
La Belle Hélène (Lyrics: Henri Meilhac & Ludovic Halévy Music: Jacques Offenbach) London production opened at the Adelphi Theatre on June 30
 The Black Crook – the first "book musical".  Broadway production opened at Niblo's Garden on September 12 and ran for 474 performances

Births
January 13 – Vasily Kalinnikov, composer (d. 1901)
March 10 – Amanda Aldridge, opera singer, teacher and composer (d. 1956)
April 1 – Ferruccio Busoni, pianist, composer (d. 1924)
April 13 – Carl Valentin Wunderle, violinist (d. 1944)
May 17 – Erik Satie, composer (d. 1925)
June 15 – Charles Wood, composer (d. 1926)
June 29 – George Frederick Boyle, composer (d. 1948)
July 13 – La Goulue, can-can dancer (d. 1929)
July 23 – Francesco Cilea, composer (d. 1950)
September 26 – George H. Clutsam, pianist, composer and writer (d. 1951)
November 7 – Paul Lincke, composer (d. 1946)
date unknown
Annibale Fagnola, violin maker (d. 1939)
Dorothea Ruggles-Brise, née Stewart-Murray, collector of traditional Scottish music (d. 1937)

Deaths
January 25 – Minna Wagner, estranged wife of Richard Wagner, 56 (heart attack)
February 6 – Anna Liszt, pianist and mother of Franz Liszt, 77
March 20 – Rikard Nordraak, composer, 21 (tuberculosis)
July 25 – Aloys Schmitt, composer, pianist and music teacher, 77
October 2 –  Adam Darr, guitarist, singer and composer, 55 (suicide by drowning)
November 26 – Adrien-Francois Servais, cellist, 59
November 29 – Sophie Löwe, operatic soprano, 51
December 1 – Jules Demersseman, flautist and composer, 33 (tuberculosis)
December 3 – Jan Kalivoda, violinist, conductor and composer, 65

References

 
19th century in music
Music by year